Sarangani's at-large congressional district is the sole congressional district of the Philippines in the province of Sarangani. It was created ahead of the 1995 Philippine House of Representatives elections following the separation of the third district from South Cotabato in 1992. The province has been electing a single representative provincewide at-large to the House of Representatives from the 10th Congress onwards. It is currently represented in the 18th Congress by Rogelio D. Pacquiao of the PDP–Laban.

Representation history

See also
Legislative districts of Sarangani

References

Congressional districts of the Philippines
Politics of Sarangani
1992 establishments in the Philippines
At-large congressional districts of the Philippines
Congressional districts of Soccsksargen
Constituencies established in 1992